2009 Regional League Division 2 was contested by the five regional league winners of the 3rd level championships of Thailand.

Five teams met on a home and away basis, with the top three teams gaining promotion to the Thai 1st Division for the 2010 campaign.

2009 Regional League Round table All locations

2009

Red Zone:2009 Regional League Division 2 Bangkok Metropolitan Region
Yellow Zone:2009 Regional League Division 2 Central & Eastern Region  
Green Zone: 2009 Regional League Division 2 Northern Region Region 
  Orange Zone:2009 Regional League Division 2 North Eastern Region 
Blue Zone:2009 Regional League Division 2 Southern Region

List of qualified teams

Champions League Round table

Results

Champions
The  2009 Regional League Division 2 winners were Raj Pracha-Nonthaburi FC

See also
 2009 Thai Premier League
 2009 Thai Division 1 League
 2009 Thai FA Cup
 2009 Kor Royal Cup

References

External links
 Football Association of Thailand

 
Thai League T4 seasons
3